Hillard "Sweet Pea" Atkinson (September 20, 1945 – May 5, 2020) was an American R&B singer known as one of the vocalists for the band Was (Not Was).

Biography
Atkinson was born in Oberlin, Ohio, and moved to Detroit as a child.   He worked at the Chrysler factory, and sang with colleagues in a local band, Hi Energy. He met Don Was in the late 1970s, when he was rehearsing at the studio used by Was.

Atkinson joined Was (Not Was) as joint lead vocalist alongside Harry Bowens. He also featured on some of the band's most successful recordings. In 1982, shortly after the release of the first Was (Not Was) album, he recorded and released his first solo album, Don't Walk Away. The album was co-produced by David and Don Was. In 1997, along with Kris Kristofferson, Atkinson starred in a 15-minute short film included on Don Was' album Forever's a Long, Long Time, which was released under the alias Orquestra Was. Atkinson also performed as lead vocalist on most of the songs on the album, on which Was interprets songs by Hank Williams.

Atkinson later joined forces with blues guitarist Randy Jacobs – also a longtime Was (Not Was) session guitarist who co-wrote the band's most successful hit, "Walk the Dinosaur" – in a band called The Boneshakers. Together they released three albums, two of which were studio recordings: Book of Spells in 1997 and Shake the Planet in 1999, both on Point Blank Records. The third album was Live in Seattle, with saxophonist Mindi Abair, which was released on Concord Records. Two more albums were credited to Mindi Abair and The Boneshakers: The EastWest Sessions (2017) and All I Got for Christmas Is the Blues (2018).

Atkinson also toured for ten years with Lyle Lovett, and sang on recordings by Bonnie Raitt, Bob Dylan, Elton John, Brian Wilson, Willie Nelson, Iggy Pop, Jackson Browne, Jimmy Barnes, and many others.

Death 
He died on May 5, 2020 from a heart attack in Los Angeles, aged 74.

Reviews 
Robert Christgau gave Don't Walk Away an A− grade, writing, "Trouper that he is, Atkinson will sing any nonsense [the Was brothers] hand him, but he obviously finds his truth in Dionne Warwick, the Tymes, General Johnson, and Eddie Rabbitt, and I'll go along with that." AllMusic's William Ruhlmann gave the album 3 stars out of 5. In his review, Ruhlmann wrote that "For all intents and purposes, this is a Was (Not Was) record" and that "mostly this record has the same sarcastic undercurrent of most of Was (Not Was)'s product."

Solo discography
Don't Walk Away (Island, 1982)
Get What You Deserve (2017)

Singles
"Dance or Die" (number 27 on Billboard Dance Club Songs, 1982)

References

External links
 

American blues singers
American dance musicians
American funk musicians
American rhythm and blues singers
20th-century African-American male singers
1945 births
2020 deaths
Was (Not Was) members
Island Records artists
People from Oberlin, Ohio
Singers from Ohio
Singers from Detroit
21st-century African-American male singers
Lyle Lovett and His Large Band members